Stone is a canal town and civil parish in Staffordshire, England,  north of the county town of Stafford,  south of Stoke-on-Trent and  north of Rugeley. It was an urban district council and a rural district council before becoming part of the Borough of Stafford in 1974.

Stone is a growing town, census data recorded a population of 12,305 in 1991, 14,555 in 2001, and 16,385 in 2011.

Etymology 
The place-name's meaning is exactly what is stated, a "stone, rock", from the Old English stān (stone).

The local story is that the town was named after the pile of stones taken from the River Trent raised on the graves of the two princes, Ruffin and Wulfad, killed in AD 665 by their father, King Wulfhere of Mercia, because of their conversion to Christianity. However, this legend is unlikely to be true. Wulfhere was already a Christian when he became king, and the story on which it is probably based is set by Bede in another part of the country over ten years after Wulfhere's death.

More recent research points to older, though no less interesting nor tangible, possibilities regarding its name and founding. Around Stone lie several Romano British sites and it is not inconceivable that the stone remains of a bridge or milestone, perhaps continuing the Roman road from Rocester to Blyth Bridge and then potentially through Stone, is alluded to in the name. The settlement of Walton (which now forms a suburb) is ancient Brythonic (Celtic/ancient Briton place name). The most likely derivation for most places called Stone is from a prehistoric megalith, Roman milestone, a natural boulder or rock formation, or from 'a place where stone was obtained' and a Keuper sandstone outcrop on the north side of Stone, long quarried for building materials, may be the topographical feature from which the place was named. It may also be noted that a huge stone or erratic is recorded on Common Plot and in that respect it is unclear whether Stone Field here, one of the open-fields of Stone is 'the field at Stone' or 'the field with the stone'.

History 
There is a Bronze Age ring ditch at Pirehill suggesting occupation in prehistoric times (County Archeology).

Stone lies within the territory of the Iron Age Celtic tribe 'the Cornovii' (people of the horn; perhaps a horned god or topographical feature) mentioned by Ptolemy 2nd century AD in Geographia. To the northwest of Stone lies one of their hill forts which overlooks the Trent and perhaps the salt production in the region.

The early history of Stone is unclear and clouded by the 12th century medieval romance concerning the murder of the Saxon princes Wulfad and Rufin by their father Wulfhere of Mercia who reputedly had his base near Darleston (Wulfherecester). The murder of Wulfad in the 7th century and his subsequent entombment under a cairn of stones is the traditional story (described as 'historically valueless' by Thacker 1985: 6).

The church built over the stones marking the graves of Wulfad and Rufin in 670 lasted until the 9th century before being destroyed by invading Danes. It was replaced in 1135 by the Augustinian Stone Priory, which survived until its dissolution in the reign of Henry VIII. The building collapsed in 1749 and the present church of St. Michael's was built in 1758. All that remains of the original priory is the rib-vaulted undercroft which forms the foundations beneath Priory House, which is located on Lichfield Street opposite the Frank Jordan Community Centre.

Stone lay within the Pirehill hundred of Staffordshire named after nearby Pire Hill. In 1251, Henry III granted Stone a market charter.

The Common Plot (aka Mudley Pits) is a large area of open and wooded common land sited just to the north of the town of Stone. The Duke of Cumberland built extensive winter fortifications and a camp here, traces of which can still be seen, during the winter of 1745/46. The purpose of the camp was to bring the Duke's army down from the freezing Staffordshire Moorlands and Peak District, where they had been seeking to stop an advance on London by a force of 6,000 Jacobite rebels. The rebels were thought to be using pack-horse routes over the high country, with the aim of reaching Derby. Stone was also strategic in preventing any break-away Jacobite group going across to Wales to recruit more men there but with winter coming on, the Jacobites decided to retreat back to Scotland.

Stone Urban District was an urban district. It was based on the Stone civil parish which equates to the town of Stone. There were two amendments in parts of the Stone Rural parish in Stone Rural District were transferred in. The district was abolished by the Local Government Act 1972, and replaced with Stafford Borough Council and Stone Town Council. The latter publishes a history of Stone.

Roads 
Stone stands in the valley of the River Trent, and was an important stopping-off point for stagecoaches on one of the roads turnpiked in the 18th century. A directory for 1851 says that Stone was a very lively town, and a great thoroughfare for coaches, carriers and travellers. No fewer than 38 stage coaches passed through the town daily. The main coaching route was the London to Holyhead route, via Watling Street as far as Lichfield and then from Lichfield to Holyhead via the A51.

To support the coaching trade Stone was a principal stopping point with many coaching inns to refresh both horses and travellers. Notable hostelries include the Crown Hotel, Crown & Anchor, Red Lion and the Black Horse Inn.

The Trent and Mersey Canal 

The River Trent, which runs through the town, had been used for cargo-carrying vessels since Roman times but further inland smaller boats could only be used. Seasonal fluctuations in water depth proved insurmountable, although cargo could be carried from the sea as far south as Wilden Ferry (southeast of Derby), where the River Derwent joins the Trent and increases the quantity of water, then onwards by road. Prior to tarmac roads, journeys overland by roads were slow and delicate wares were prone to breakages over the rough terrain.

James Brindley, the canal builder, put forward the scheme to build what he called the Grand Trunk Canal to connect the two rivers, Mersey and Trent in 1766. It was backed by Josiah Wedgwood who saw that it offered an efficient way to bring raw materials to the potteries and to transport finished wares to his customers.

By 29 September 1772 (Brindley died on 27 September), 48 miles of the Grand Trunk Canal (now known as the Trent and Mersey Canal) from Wilden Ferry to Stone was navigable — the length past Burton-on-Trent being completed in 1770.

On completion of the Star Lock a grand opening was held, and during this opening a cannon was fired in celebration. However disaster struck and the cannon damaged the new lock, requiring a re-build.

Stone became the headquarters of the canal company with its office at Westbridge House, sited then below Star Lock on what is now Westbridge Park. The offices were moved later to Stoke-on-Trent.

Brewing industry 

Due to the quality of the local water beneath Stone two brewers were located here carrying on the Augustinian monks' tradition of beer making. The most notable was John Joule & Sons Ltd, established in 1780. The company was acquired by Bass Charrington in 1968, and ceased brewing at the end of October 1974. The brewery was demolished in the Autumn of 1977. The adjacent bottling plant was closed some years before. The canal played a great part in the export of beer. Joules once owned a pair of boats that delivered coal to the brewery and as late as the 1950s had the telephone number ‘Stone 1’. Joules' draught beer stores and bottling plant remains an imposing building on the canal and can be clearly identified by the red cross logo of John Joules in the brickwork.

The second brewer was Montgomery & Co, acquired by the Bent's Brewery Co of Liverpool in 1889. The brewery was located on what is now Mount Industrial Estate. It was also taken over by Bass and closed on 31 March 1968. Although the brewing industry in Stone ceased following the closure of Joules and Bents following an aggressive takeover from the nearby Burton upon Trent brewers in the 1960s and 1970s, in recent years it has begun anew with the opening of the Lymestone Brewery in 2008. This family-run microbrewery is based in part of the original Bents brewery.

More recently a second microbrewery, trading under the name Joules, dropping the 'John' due to trademark reasons, has begun brewing in Market Drayton, Shropshire. A pint of both Lymestone and Joules can be tasted at the Swan Inn; Lymestone Brewery also has their own public house - The Borehole Inn, situated next to the brewery itself.

The Star Public House was fully licensed in 1819 although the building predates the canal by some 200 years. The building has in its time been a butcher’s shop and slaughterhouse. Stabling for boat horses was available up to the 1950s and the business relied heavily on the canal for trade.

Public transport 

The coming of the railway was to end Stone's era as a coaching and canal town. The North Staffordshire Railway opened its main line from Stoke-on-Trent through Stone to Norton Bridge on 3 April 1848; the following year a branch line from Stone to Colwich began operating.

One industry that did flourish under the railway era was the shoe industry, at its height in 1851 there were 16 shoeworks. The industry however declined after Australia, the main shoe market, imposed an import tax on the industry.

Present day

Stone Parish Church, dedicated to Saint Michael the Archangel, is at the south end of the town located on what used to be Stone Priory. It was commenced in 1753, and finished in 1758. The present clock dates from 1896.

Christ Church stands on the north side of the town, where the population is still increasing. It was erected in 1839.

The canal still dominates the town.  Many canal side sites have in recent times been taken over for modern day use including The Moorings, a development of apartments based on the old Stubbs warehouse. Apartments and housing surround the old Trent Hospital, once the workhouse. Housing developments also border the canal.

Commercial traffic has now been replaced by the leisure craft that pass through Stone each year. The Canal Cruising Company today operates from the historic site of the canal maintenance and boat building operations of the Trent and Mersey Canal Company. This restored docks complex with its workshops, by Yard Lock, continues to be used for the maintenance of pleasure craft and historic boats. In 2010 a new marina opened just south of the town, below Aston Lock, with moorings for pleasure craft, a farm shop and a café.

State education within Stone is based on the three tier school system, with a range of first and primary schools, two middle schools (Walton Priory Middle and Christchurch Academy) and a high school (Alleyne's Academy). Independent education is served by the Catholic St Dominic's Priory School founded with the convent of the same name in the 19th century by Mother Margaret Hallahan when the school was originally known as "Blessed Imelda's Enpension School".

Staffordshire Fire and Rescue Service has its headquarters just south of Stone. Yarnfield Park Training and Conference Centre just outside the town is a major training centre for the UK telecommunications industry. It is owned by BT Group and run by Accenture.

Stone is the key UK manufacturing site for the Quickfit laboratory glassware system which finds widespread use in many school, college and university science departments.

The National Association of Chimney Sweeps is located in the town.

The town is home to two football clubs, Stone Old Alleynians F.C. of the North West Counties Football League and Stone Dominoes F.C. of the Staffordshire County Senior League. Both teams share a fully enclosed floodlit stadium at Yarnfield, named Springbank Park. Staffordshire County Cricket Club play Minor Counties Championship matches at Lichfield Road, as do the town's cricket club, Stone Cricket Club.

The Stone Food and Drink Festival takes place the first weekend in October and brings together the very best in local produce and cooking talent. It attracts in excess of 20,000 visitors to the town and runs for one week in total with the 'main event' on the town's Westbridge Park on Friday, Saturday and Sunday.

Media

Television 
Television news is covered by BBC Midlands Today and ITV Central, both of which come from Birmingham. Stone can receive good to marginal signals from the Sutton Coldfield transmitting station and from The Wrekin transmitting station, which can be received in the higher parts of town.

Radio 
Stone's local radio stations are Signal 1 and BBC Radio Stoke, which broadcast from studios in Stoke-on-Trent. However, some parts of the town can also receive Free Radio Black Country and Shropshire, Greatest Hits Radio, BBC WM, BBC Radio Cymru and Heart and Smooth from the West Midlands and North West.

Newspapers 
Stone is covered by two daily newspapers, The Sentinel from Stoke-on-Trent and the Express and Star from Wolverhampton. The weekly Staffordshire Newsletter and the bi-monthly Stone and Eccleshall Gazette also cover the town.

Magazines 
The Stone and Eccleshall Gazette

Community news website 
Stone has an independent community news website called A Little Bit Of Stone which delivers up to date news and information for the residents and visitors of Stone. The website is supported by active social media accounts on Facebook, Twitter, Instagram and YouTube.

Football 
 Stone Old Alleynians F.C.
 Stone Dominoes F.C.

Transport

Stone railway station, on the West Coast Main Line, serves the town. An hourly semi-fast direct service has been operated by London Midland and West Midlands Trains since 2008. This runs south to London Euston via Stafford and the Trent Valley line, and north to Crewe via Stoke-on-Trent.  Passenger numbers have risen 152 per cent between 2008 and June 2012 with three more services per day are being planned to cope with demand. Figures for 2019/20 are 184,000 passengers

Stone's main bus service is the First Potteries' route 101  which runs north to Tittensor, Trentham, Newcastle-under-Lyme and Stoke-on-Trent and south to Stafford. It calls at several places in Stone, like the schools. D&G Bus run six local services in and around Stone.

Two trunk roads go through the town, the A34 linking Birmingham to Manchester and the A51 linking Lichfield to Chester. Stone is by-passed by the M6 motorway.

In recent times cycling north from the town along the canal towpath towards Barlaston Trentham and Stoke-on-Trent is much improved. In June 2012 the local authorities announced a £700,000 scheme to rectify the problem, with new paths. To the south, towards Burston, Weston and Great Haywood the towpath is passable on a bicycle but better suited to a mountain bike rather than a racing bike.

Stone's main car and van rental service is Stone Van Hire, aiding ventures around Stone's town and further afield in Staffordshire.

Buildings
Stone has many buildings of interest including the Grade II listed Hayes House and the Catholic chapel of St Anne.

Notable people

 Werburgh (died 699) an Anglo-Saxon princess, was born in Stone and died in Trentham
 James Brindley, (1716 – 1772) the Surveyor-General of the Trent & Mersey Canal
 John Jervis, 1st Earl of St Vincent, (1735 in Meaford Hall – 1823) colleague of Lord Nelson, victor in a battle Cape St Vincent in 1797. He was buried in the family mausoleum in Stone. Earl St Vincent Square in Stone (at the south end of the High St) is named after him and a monument was erected in the crypt of St. Paul's Cathedral.
 Stebbing Shaw, (1762 near Stone –1802) a cleric, local historian and topographer
 Peter de Wint, (1784 in Stone – 1849) landscape painter featured in the National Gallery
 William Bernard Ullathorne, (1806 – 1889)  Roman Catholic Bishop of Birmingham is buried in the Catholic Church in Stone
 Augusta Theodosia Drane (1823–1894)  writer and Roman Catholic nun, was prioress of the Stone convent 1872-1881
 Thomas Smith (1847 in Stone – 1919) trade union leader and Liberal politician, general secretary of National Union of Boot and Shoe Rivetters and Finishers
 Frank Clewlow, (1885 in Stone – 1957) actor-director, worked in England, Scotland, Australia & New Zealand
 Eva Morris, (1885 – 2000) the oldest person in the world from December 1999 to her death at the Autumn House Nursing Home in Stone in November 2000, aged 114
 Sarah Ward (1895–1965), politician
 L. T. C. Rolt, (1910 – 1974) author of ‘Narrowboat’ and several engineering biographies
 Frank Thomas (1930 in Stone – 1988) Roman Catholic Bishop of Northampton
 David Warrilow, (1934 in Stone – 1995) actor, interprets the works of Samuel Beckett
 Cedric Price, (1934 in Stone – 2003) an architect, teacher and writer on architecture
 Sir William Nigel Paul Cash (born 1940) known as Bill Cash, is a British Conservative politician and MP for Stone 
 Terry Darlington (born c.1940?) author of Narrow Dog to Carcassonne, Narrow Dog to Indian River and Narrow Dog to Wigan Pier
 A. N. Wilson (born 1950 in Stone) writer and newspaper columnist
 Ian Morris (born 1960) historian and author of Why the West Rules—For Now, went to school in Stone
 Scout Niblett (born 1973 in Stone) an indie rock musician
 Helen Morgan (born 1974/75 in Stone), Liberal Democrat politician, now MP for North Shropshire since 2021.
 Jackie Degg, (born 1978 in Stone) former model and page 3 girl

Notable in sport 

 Tom Fishwick (1876 in Stone – 1950) an English cricketer, played first-class cricket for Warwickshire
 Arthur Fernie (1877 in Stone – 1959) an English cricketer, played first-class cricket for Cambridge University and the Marylebone Cricket Club
 Billy Tompkinson (1895 in Stone – 1968) footballer, played for Wolves, Rochdale, Stockport County and Stoke
 Bertie Shardlow (1909 in Stone – 1976) cricketer, boat carpenter and father of Paul Shardlow
 Russell Flower (born 1942 in Stone) left-handed batsman, bowled slow left-arm orthodox
 Paul Shardlow (1943 in Stone – 1968) an English professional goalkeeper for Stoke City F.C. and cricket player
 John James (born 1948 in Stone) footballer, played for Port Vale F.C., Chester F.C. and Tranmere Rovers F.C. made 381 appearances 
 Stan Collymore, (born 1971 in Stone) former footballer and TV pundit
 Keri Lees (born 1972 in Stone) retired English athlete, competed in the 100 & 400 metres hurdles at the 2000 Summer Olympics
 Chris Birchall, (born 1984) footballer, played for LA Galaxy and internationally for Trinidad and Tobago went to school in Stone
 Andy Wilkinson, (born 1984 in Stone) defender with Stoke City F.C. from 1998 
 Lizzie Neave (born 1987) Olympic canoeist, lived in Stone and trained at the Stafford and Stone Canoe Club. 
 Joe Clarke (born 1992) Olympic gold medal winner in the 2016 Summer Olympics in Rio, attended Alleyne's Academy in Stone

Twin towns

See also
Listed buildings in Stone, Staffordshire
Listed buildings in Stone Rural
Stone Meadows

References

External links

 1851 description of Stone parish
 Christ Church
 The Trent & Mersey Canal
 
 Website of Potteries.org Neville Malkin's "Grand Tour" of the Potteries Retrieved Feb 2017 = Has several old pictures, drawings and historical narrative about St Michael's Church, the Jervis Mausoleum, Joule's Brewery and the Railway station

 
Towns in Staffordshire
Civil parishes in Staffordshire
Borough of Stafford